Aaron Posner is an American playwright and theater director. He was co-founder of the Arden Theatre Company in Philadelphia and was the artistic director of Two River Theatre from 2006 to 2010. He has directed over 100 productions at major regional theater companies across the country. He has won many awards including six Helen Hayes Awards, two Barrymore Awards, the Outer Critics Circle Award, the John Gassner Prize, a Joseph Jefferson Award,a Bay Area Theatre Award, an Eliot Norton Award, and many more.

Biography
Born in Madison, Wisconsin, and raised in Eugene, Oregon, Posner is married to actress Erin Weaver, who he met when she was a student of his at University of the Arts. They have one daughter.

Posner has adapted novels as plays, and later created new variations of classic plays, including some by Shakespeare and Chekhov. Among Posner's best-known adaptions are The Chosen (1999), based on Chaim Potok's 1967 novel of the same name, and My Name Is Asher Lev (2009), based on Potok's 1972 novel of the same name.

With composer James Sugg, Posner created A Murder, A Mystery & A Marriage: A Mark Twain Musical (2006), adapted from a short story of the same name by Mark Twain that was published in 2001. Posner wrote the book and lyrics. The work was premiered in Wilmington, Delaware in a co-production of the Round House Theatre and the Delaware Theater Company.

Posner's variation of Anton Chekhov's 1896 play The Seagull, under the title of Stupid Fucking Bird, was premiered in 2013 by the Woolly Mammoth Theatre Company in Washington, D.C. It was a very different type of work, his own answer to Chekhov, rather than a classical adaptation. The play has since been produced more than 200 times by theatre companies and universities in the United States (US) and abroad, including professional productions in Australia, Canada, Estonia, and Sweden.

Posner has adapted Chekhov's Uncle Vanya and Three Sisters as well. His Life Sucks: Or the Present Ridiculous (2015) was premiered by Theater J in Washington, D.C. No Sisters (2017), which was premiered by the Studio Theatre in Washington, D.C., ran as a companion play to their production of Three Sisters.

Posner has also re-imagined Shakespeare's The Merchant of Venice, in a variation called District Merchants: An Uneasy Comedy (2016) commissioned by Folger Theatre. It is set in Washington, D.C., during the Reconstruction era, after the end of the Civil War. Exploring relations between Jewish and African-American businessmen and other residents in the city, including people of color free before the war and newly emancipated freedmen, it premiered at the Folger Shakespeare Library on May 31, 2016.

Posner is also an associate professor of acting and directing at American University in Washington, D.C.

References

External links

Sydney-Chanele Dawkins, "The Playwright's Playground: Playwright Aaron Posner Talks About Inspiration, Adaptations and That Stupid Fucking Bird ", DCMetro Theatre Arts, 31 July 2014

Living people
Year of birth missing (living people)
Writers from Eugene, Oregon
Writers from Madison, Wisconsin
21st-century American dramatists and playwrights
American theatre directors
21st-century American male writers
American male dramatists and playwrights
20th-century American dramatists and playwrights
20th-century American male writers
American University faculty and staff